Simpático is an album by American jazz vibraphonist Gary McFarland and Hungarian guitarist Gábor Szabó featuring performances recorded in 1966 for the Impulse! label.

Reception
The Allmusic review by Douglas Payne awarded the album 2 stars stating "Simpatico features its principals' lackluster singing and silly lyrics, but there are occasional hints of their abilities".

Track listing
 "The Word" (John Lennon, Paul McCartney) - 2:15
 "Nature Boy" (Eden Ahbez) - 2:48
 "Norwegian Wood (This Bird Has Flown)" (Lennon, McCartney) - 2:35
 "Hey, Here's a Heart" (Gary McFarland, Cliff Owen) - 2:39
 "Cool Water" (Bob Nolan) - 2:36
 "Ups and Downs" (Gary McFarland) - 2:59
 "Yamaha Mama" (Gábor Szabó) - 2:16
 "You Will Pay" (Szabó) - 2:48
 "Spring Song" (Szabó) - 2:20
 "She's a Cruiser" (McFarland) - 2:36
 "Simpático" (McFarland) - 4:45
Recorded at Van Gelder Studio in Englewood Cliffs, New Jersey on May 18, 1966 (tracks 3, 5, 8 & 10), and May 20, 1966 (tracks 1, 2, 4, 6, 7-9 & 11)

Personnel
Gary McFarland – vibes, whistling, vocals
Gábor Szabó - guitar, vocals
Sam Brown - guitar
Bob Bushnell (tracks 4 & 7) Richard Davis (tracks 1–3, 5, 6 & 8–11) - bass
Joe Cocuzzo – drums
Tommy Lopez, Barry Rodgers - percussion

References

Impulse! Records albums
Gary McFarland albums
Gábor Szabó albums
1966 albums
Albums produced by Bob Thiele
Albums recorded at Van Gelder Studio
Collaborative albums